Wadham New Cut is a minor,  long river (brook) and drainage ditch of the Pevensey Levels in the civil parish of Westham, Wealden District of East Sussex, England, that is a tributary to Winters Cut. Rising from Duckpuddle north of the A27 road—forming the boundary between the civil parish of Polegate—Wadham New Cut flows northeasterly for the entirety of its course.

References 

Rivers of East Sussex
Rivers of the Pevensey Levels